The 2003 UEFA Super Cup was played on 29 August 2003 between Milan of Italy and Porto of Portugal. Milan qualified by defeating Juventus in the 2003 UEFA Champions League Final, while Porto qualified by beating Celtic in the 2003 UEFA Cup Final. Milan won the match 1–0. After the match, defeated Porto manager José Mourinho said, "We leave here convinced we can go into the UEFA Champions League with the hope and certainty we can compete with any team." They finished the season as 2003–04 UEFA Champions League winners.

Venue
The Stade Louis II in Monaco has been the venue for the UEFA Super Cup every year since 1998. Built in 1985, the stadium is also the home of AS Monaco, who play in the French league system.

Teams

Match

Details

See also
2002–03 UEFA Champions League
2002–03 UEFA Cup
A.C. Milan in European football
FC Porto in international football competitions

References

2003
Super Cup
Uefa Super Cup
Super Cup 2003
Super Cup 2003
International club association football competitions hosted by Monaco
August 2003 sports events in Europe